To Retire (Το Ρετιρέ; English: The Penthouse) was a very popular Greek sitcom that aired from 1990 to 1992 on the Greek channel Mega. It was written and directed by Yiannis Dalianidis.

Characters
The main character is Katerina Sofianou, played by Katerina Gioulaki. Katerina is a divorced, nervous lady that lives with her mother Sofia and her niece Eirini. She wants to get married again but her family does not like the groom.
The other characters are Katerina's friend and colleagues: Haroula, Iason, Eleni, Foivos etc.

Plot
The idea of this sitcom is  about the everyday life of modern Greeks; their habits, their problems, their affairs. Katerina wants to get married but Sofia hates the groom. Eirini wants to buy a new video recorder but Katerina thinks that is too expensive. Foivos loves Haroula but she does not see him as a lover. All the stories take place in Athens of the early '90s.

Similarities
A few years after To Retire, Yiannis Dalianidis wrote and directed a new sitcom, Oi Mikromesaioi which was a total copy of his previous work. But still, To Retire was not original either. In the late '80s Dalianidis had written a sitcom about modern Greeks and their problems, titled Odos Antheon, which in many ways is similar to both of his following creations.

Success
To Retire was actually a big hit and it is one of the most popular Greek sitcoms. Every summer it is aired again and again on Mega. In the 2008 summer, the sitcom experienced another rerun, also with success. The average rates were 17%, which is very good, especially if you consider that the American sitcom Ugly Betty reached 8% when it is aired on the same time with To Retire.

Sources
 http://www.megatv.com

Mega Channel original programming
Greek television sitcoms
1990 Greek television series debuts
1991 Greek television series endings
1990s Greek television series